

References

2013 Pakistani general election